Is Anybody Listening?: How and why United States Business Fumbles when it Talks with Human Beings is book by urbanist William H. Whyte. This book on business and public relations was first published in 1952 by Simon & Schuster.

External links
 , American Journal of Sociology, Volume 58, Number 4 | Jan., 1953
 Reviews the book "Is Anybody Listening," by William H. Whyte Jr., Bernstein, Marver, 1952, Public Opinion Quarterly;Summer52, Vol. 16 Issue 2, p296
 Review, foreignaffairs, October 1952 Issue
 Review, New York Times, DAVID L. COHNAPRIL 6, 1952

1952 non-fiction books
Simon & Schuster books